The 1926 United States Senate election in Connecticut was held on November 2, 1926.

Incumbent Senator Hiram Bingham III, who won a 1924 special election to complete the unexpired term of Frank B. Brandegee, was re-elected to a full term in office over Democrat Rollin U. Tyler.

Republican nomination
At the Republican convention in Hartford on September 13, Senator Bingham was unopposed for re-nomination.

Democratic nomination

Candidates
Rollin Tyler, Probate Court Judge and nominee for Governor in 1920

Declined
Charles Gould Morris, nominee for Governor in 1924 (ran for Governor)
William E. Thoms, judge and former Mayor of Waterbury

Campaign
The Senate nomination was largely seen as a secondary consolation prize in the campaign for Governor. The two leading candidates for that office were Charles Gould Morris and William E. Thoms. On the eve of the convention, Thoms appeared the have the edge for Governor, leaving the Senate nomination to Morris.

Convention
At the convention, Thoms declined to stand for any office; his supporters suggested he would run in 1928 on a ticket with Al Smith. Morris took the gubernatorial nomination for the second consecutive campaign, and Probate Court Judge Rollin Tyler was nominated for Senate. The party platform urged for the repeal of Prohibition, which was an "indefensible curtailment of personal liberty," and decentralization of government from Washington to the states.

General election

Candidates
Hiram Bingham III, incumbent Senator since 1924 (Republican)
Morris Rice (Socialist)
Rollin U. Tyler, Probate Court Judge and nominee for Governor in 1920 (Democratic)

Campaign
Bingham and the entire Republican ticket cruised to re-election. By October 31, the New York Times confidently predicted that he would win.

Results

See also 
 1926 United States Senate elections

References 

1926
Connecticut
United States Senate